Cantel Medical Corporation is an American company which produces and sells medical equipment. The company is based in Little Falls, NJ. The company has three subsidiaries:

 MEDIVATORS, based in Minneapolis, MN, which sells Dialysis, Endoscope Reprocessing and Therapeutic Filtration
 Crosstex, based in Hauppauge, NY, which sells healthcare disposables, primarily dental supplies and disinfectants 
 Mar Cor Purification, with locations in Skippack, PA and Plymouth, MN, which manufactures and sells water purification and filtration products to the medical, pharmaceutical, biotechnology, research and other industrial markets.

History
On March 21, 2018, Cantel acquired Belgium-based Aexis Medical for $24.8 million. Aexis had ~60 employees at the time of the acquisition.

On January 11, 2019, Cantel acquired Ashland, Ohio-based Vista Research Group for $10.5 million.

On October 2, 2019, Cantel acquired Chicago-based dental instrument maker Hu-Friedy for $719.4 million.

In June 2021, Steris, an American medical equipment company, acquired Cantel Medical Corporation.

References

External links 
 

Medical technology companies of the United States
Medical device manufacturers
Companies based in Passaic County, New Jersey
Little Falls, New Jersey
Companies formerly listed on the New York Stock Exchange
2021 mergers and acquisitions